General elections were held in Venezuela on 14 December 1947. The presidential elections were won by Rómulo Gallegos of Democratic Action, who received 74.3% of the vote, the largest presidential win in Venezuela's modern history. His party won 83 of the 110 seats in the Chamber of Deputies and 38 of the 46 seats in the Senate.

The election has been described as the first honest election in Venezuelan history. In previous elections, the Congress of Venezuela had decided and voted on who would assume the presidency.

Results

President

Congress
In Mérida, the COPEI ran in alliance with the Republican Federal Union. In Tachira the URD ran in alliance with the Liberal Party of Tachira. In the Amazonas Federal Territory the URD ran in alliance with the Progressive Liberal Party.

Chamber seat distribution by state

Senate seat distribution by state

State legislative assemblies

Municipal councils

References

1947 in Venezuela
Venezuela
Elections in Venezuela
Presidential elections in Venezuela
Election and referendum articles with incomplete results
December 1947 events in South America